Trichocera garretti is a species of winter crane flies in the family Trichoceridae.

References

Tipulomorpha
Articles created by Qbugbot
Insects described in 1927